HMS Ferret was a 14-gun two-masted sloop of the Royal Navy, built on speculation by Henry Bird at Deptford Wet Dock on the Thames River, England in the same way as the preceding Saltash had been two years earlier. She was purchased while building by the Navy Board on 6 April 1743. 

The new sloop was launched on 10 May, and was commissioned in the same month under Commander John Moore, and served initially until 1748. In early 1749 she was modified, with her quarterdeck extended by several feet and her main mast shortened. In May 1749 she sailed for Jamaica, and remained in the West Indies until 1754. She was re-rigged as a ship sloop (by the addition of a mizzen mast) and recommissioned in April 1755 under Commander Arthur Upton; she was lost, presumed to have foundered in a hurricane off Nova Scotia on 24 September 1757.

References
 
 McLaughlan, Ian. The Sloop of War 1650–1763. Seaforth Publishing, 2014. .
 Rif Winfield (2007). British Warships in the Age of Sail, 1714–1792: Design, Construction, Careers and Fates. Seaforth Publishing. .

Sloops of the Royal Navy
1743 ships
Maritime incidents in 1757